Rho GTPase-activating protein 8 is a protein that in humans is encoded by the ARHGAP8 gene.

Function 

This gene encodes a member of the RHOGAP family. GAP (GTPase-activating) family proteins participate in signaling pathways that regulate cell processes involved in cytoskeletal changes. GAP proteins alternate between an active (GTP-bound) and inactive (GDP-bound) state based on the GTP:GDP ratio in the cell. Rare read-through transcripts, containing exons from the PRR5 gene which is located immediately upstream, led to the original description of this gene as encoding a RHOGAP protein containing the proline-rich domains characteristic of PRR5 proteins. Alternatively spliced variants encoding different isoforms have been described.

References

External links

Further reading